This list of rail trails in New York lists former railroad rights-of-way in New York that have been converted to rail trails for public use. Many of these rail trails are also part of the statewide Empire State Trail network, which officially opened Jan. 1, 2021.

Trails 
 *trail that is part of the Empire State Trail network

See also 
 List of trails in New York, for notable non-rail trails

References

External links 
 Rail-Trails of New York State
 Friends of Genesee Valley Greenway
 Victor Hiking Trails
  Chautauqua Rails to Trails

 
New York
Rail trails
Rail trails